Taman Mujur is a peaceful housing estate in Perak, Malaysia.  It is located within Bercham (a suburb of the city of Ipoh) near Taman Restu and Taman Anjung Bercham Indah.  It has a field with basketball courts and sepak takraw court.  Every morning elders from the neighbourhood can be seen doing their t'ai chi exercises and at the same time children and teenagers playing around.  It also has a telephone booth for the surrounding residents. It is adjacent to a petrol station and there's a few shoplots which houses a mini mart, restaurants, car accessories, hardware and saloons.  This peaceful garden has around 1000 houses. Many people choose to stay at Taman Mujur because it is very near to stores and it is near to the best police station in Asia.

Populated places in Perak